Correão, also known Estádio Alair Corrêa, is a multi-use stadium located in Cabo Frio, Brazil. It is used mostly for football matches and hosts the home matches of Associação Desportiva Cabofriense. The stadium has a maximum capacity of 12,000 people. The stadium is named after former Cabo Frio mayor Alair Francisco Corrêa, who governed the city from 2001 to 2004.

References

Football venues in Rio de Janeiro (state)
Sports venues in Rio de Janeiro (state)